Kushal Dowari (born 1 July 1966 in Bokata Khamun, Sivasagar) is a Bharatiya Janata Party politician from Assam. He was elected in the Assam Legislative Assembly election in 2016 from Thowra constituency. He is a former militant  of United Liberation Front of Asom.

Dowari was a SULFA leader before elected as an MLA.

He is a former president of Samaj Bikash Manch a Social Organisation as well as founding president of Nabadeep Samay Bikash Manch an NGO established by Bharatiya Janata Party.

References 

1966 births
Living people
Bharatiya Janata Party politicians from Assam
Assam MLAs 2016–2021
People from Sivasagar
ULFA members